The 2018 season was Hamilton City SC's second season in the Canadian Soccer League. The season marked the return of Hamilton after a season's absence in order to reorganize. Their season began on May 19, 2018 in an away match to FC Vorkuta. Throughout the season Hamilton clinched an playoff berth after finishing fifth in the First Division. Their postseason journey came to a quick conclusion after a defeat to Scarborough SC in the Quarterfinals. The club's top goalscorer was Sani Dey with 13 goals, which made him the league's top goalscorer and was awarded the CSL Golden Boot.

Summary 
After a one year sabbatical Hamilton returned to the Canadian Soccer League under new management. Former Brantford Galaxy head coach Sasa Vukovic was appointed in that capacity. In preparation for the season the organization transferred their home venue to Heritage Green Sport Park. The roster assembled by Vukovic consisted of former players and talent from their previous reserve team. Hamilton managed to produce an average season enough to secure a playoff berth with a fifth place standing in the First Division. In the postseason Hamilton faced Scarborough SC in the opening round, but were defeated in the opening round.

Team

Roster

Management

Transfers

In

Competitions

Canadian Soccer League

First Division

Results summary

Results by round

Matches

Postseason

Statistics

Goals 
Correct as of September 30, 2018

References 

 
Hamilton City SC
Hamilton City SC
Hamilton City SC